Ricardo Guillermo Maliandi (born in La Plata, 1930, died 12 February 2015) Argentine writer and philosopher, devoted to ethics.

He was professor in many Argentine universities and researcher in CONICET. Doctor in Philosophy for Mainz University, Germany. He received Konex Prize in 1986 for his labor on ethics.

As well he is chairman of Argentine Association of Ethical Researches, fellow of National Academy of Sciences and honorary member of Argentine Association of Bioethics.

His researches started on axiology, especially the works of Nicolai Hartmann, from who he has translated many books. Afterward he made an approach to Discourse Ethics and became friend of one of his founders, Karl-Otto Apel. From many years he works in an original propose which he call "ethics of convergence".

Ethics of convergence
From the beginning of his philosophical career Ricardo Maliandi has researched on material ethics of values, especially Nicolai Hartmann's approach (see Maliandi's doctoral thesis, Mainz University, Wertobjektivität und Realitätserfahrung). Two problems were always under his attention in ethics: foundation and conflicti. He was convinced the intuitionism of axiological ethics is not enough for a rigorous foundation, but aware as well of the very suggestions of Hartmann analysis on conflictive relations among values, ethical thinking of Maliandi develops as a pursuit of an ethical foundation non-intuitionist, that recognizes conflicts. Sometimes, this research was close to Philosophical Anthropology (see Cultura y conflicto).

In his newest works are very important transcendental pragmatics and Discourse Ethics of Karl-Otto Apel. They both offer a new aprioristic foundation, but different of the intuitionist. Maliandi introduces, as a programmatic propose, an approaching between Harmtann's and Apel's ethics, in the sense of the conflictive structure of  ethos (emphasized by Hartmann) and a pragmatic-trascendental reflexive foundation (held by Apel) (see, Transformación y síntesis). The aprioristic axis that, despite of multiple differences of these approaches, linked these two philosophers, allows Maliandi to make a defense of universalism against the unilateral stressing of difference, as appeared in actual irrational trends (see Dejar la posmodernidad. La ética frente al irracionalismo actual). This effort is complemented with the development of a theory of reason and stresses its  "bidimensionality" (foundation and critique) and its "dialogicity" (the fact that reason only works as dialogical communication as it is exposed in Volver a la razón).

Maliandi's ethical conception can be summarized, as he proposed, as "ethics of convergence", he continues working on this topic. (See La ética cuestionada.. Prolegómenos para una ética convergente, 1998. Ética: dilemas y convergencias, 2006, Teoría y praxis de los principios bioéticos –with Oscar Thüer—Buenos Aires, UNLa, 2008 ). “Convergence” is understood as:

1) an approaching between material ethics of values and discourse ethics, and as a result, between the admission of the inevitability of conflicts and a propose for strong foundation, a priori (conjunction of that “a priori of conflictivity” derives from).

2) a basic feature of an ethics that recognizes a plurality of principles, but as well, at the same time, demands to maximize harmony between them.

Philosophical writings
 2010 – Discurso y convergencia. "La ética discursiva de Karl-Otto Apel y el laberinto de los conflictos". Buenos Aires: Oinos (edición auspiciada por la Facultad de Filosofía y Letras de la Universidad Autónoma de Nuevo León, México). .
 2010 – (editor) Jornadas Nacionales de Ética 2009: Conflictividad, dos tomos, Buenos Aires, UCES. .
 2009 – Valores blasfemos. "Diálogos con Heidegger y Gadamer". Buenos Aires: Las Cuarenta.  . With Graciela Fernández.
 2008 – Teoría y praxis de los principios bioéticos con Oscar Thüer. Escalada: UNLa.
 2006 – Ética, dilemas y convergencias. Buenos Aires: Biblos.
 1998 – La ética cuestionada. Buenos Aires: Almagesto.
 1997 – Volver a la razón. Buenos Aires: Biblos.
 1993 – Dejar la posmodernidad. Buenos Aires: Almagesto.
 1991 – Ética: conceptos y problemas. Buenos Aires: Biblos (4th re-edition, 2004).
 1991 – Transformación y síntesis. Buenos Aires: Almagesto.
 1984 – Cultura y conflicto. Buenos Aires: Biblos.
 1967 – Hartmann. Buenos Aires: Centro Editor de América Latina.
 1966 – Wertobjektivität und Realitätserfahrung. Bonn: Bouvier.

Other writings
  2001 – La nariz de Cleopatra, Buenos Aires: Leviatán.
  2003 – 16 jueces y 1 ahorcado, Mar del Plata: Ed. Suárez.
  1981 – La novela dentro de la novela.
 1972 – Naufragio de la piel.

Homages
Cristina Ambrosini (editor) Ética. Convergencias y divergencias. Homenaje a Ricardo Maliandi, Remedios de Escalada, Ediciones de la UNLa, 2009, 443 pp., .

Michelini, Dorando; José San Martín y Jutta Wester (editores) Ética, discurso, conflictividad. Homenaje a Ricardo Maliandi, Universidad Nacional de Río Cuarto, Argentina, 1995, .

References

External links
 Papers by Ricardo Maliandi
 Paper by Ricardo Maliandi "Esbozo de fundamentación desde la Ética Convergente" in book La ética en la encrucijada
 Konex Prize 1986
 Video on Ricardo Maliandi's Philosophy and Biography

1930 births
2015 deaths
Argentine philosophers
Argentine male writers
Burials at La Plata Cemetery